The American Church in Paris (formerly the American Chapel in Paris) was the first American church established outside the United States. It traces its roots back to 1814, and the present church building - located at 65 Quai d'Orsay in the 7th arrondissement of Paris, France - dates to 1931.

History

In 1814, American Protestants started worshiping together in homes around Paris and at the Oratoire du Louvre temple. The first American sanctuary was built in 1857, on rue de Berri.

The American Church in Paris was then, as now, an independent interdenominational fellowship, for all those adhering to the historic Christian tradition as expressed in the Apostles' Creed. It served both the American expat community, and a wide variety of other English-speaking people from different countries and denominational backgrounds.

Today
The American Church, or ACP, continues to minister to many Anglophone Protestants in Paris, with multicultural programming, and a congregation coming from some 40 nations and 35 Christian denominations.

The congregation is led in worship by the senior pastor, associate pastor, youth pastor and a retired guest pastor who handles weddings. Its staff is also diverse in terms of background and denomination. It is run by a church council represented by a committee of ministries namely: Communications, Community Life, Christian Education, Development and Property, Finance and Stewardship, Human Resources, Membership and Evangelism, Mission Outreach, and Worship and Music. The building hosts two bilingual nursery schools, a variety of twelve-step program recovery groups, fitness classes, kung fu, basketball leagues, a free concert series, and an ad board for housing and job opportunities. Many more community-based services are housed in the church building.

The closest métro station is Invalides

Gallery

See also
American Cathedral in Paris
American Church in Berlin
American Church in Rome
The Scots Kirk

References

Sources

External links

 Official website
 A Glimpse of Heaven a Documentary Film on the American Church in Paris

Protestant churches in Paris
American expatriates in France
Buildings and structures in the 7th arrondissement of Paris